The Xanthomonas Phage Holin (XanPHol) Family (TC# 1.E.45) consists of a single protein (Putative holin; TC# 1.E.45.1.1) of 64 amino acyl residues (aas) in length with 2 transmembrane segments (TMSs). It is a putative uncharacterized protein from Xanthomonas phage Xp15.  This protein corresponds to sequence 68 from patent US 7919601 ('Identification and use of genes encoding holins and holin-like proteins in plants for the control of microbes and pests'). As of March 2016, this protein does not show appreciable sequence similarity to any other proteins in the NCBI protein database.

See also 
 Holin
 Lysin
 Transporter Classification Database

Further reading

References 

Protein families
Membrane proteins
Transmembrane proteins
Transmembrane transporters
Transport proteins
Integral membrane proteins
Holins